This is a list of the mammal species recorded in Yemen. There are sixty-nine mammal species in Yemen, of which two are endangered, seven are vulnerable, and three are near threatened. Two of the species listed for Yemen are extinct.

The following tags are used to highlight each species' conservation status as assessed by the International Union for Conservation of Nature:

Order: Hyracoidea (hyraxes) 

The hyraxes are four species of fairly small, thickset, herbivorous mammals in the order Hyracoidea. About the size of a domestic cat, they are well-furred, with rounded bodies and a stumpy tail. They are native to Africa and the Middle East.

Family: Procaviidae (hyraxes)
Genus: Procavia
 Cape hyrax, P. capensis

Order: Sirenia (manatees and dugongs) 

Sirenia is an order of fully aquatic, herbivorous mammals that inhabit rivers, estuaries, coastal marine waters, swamps, and marine wetlands. All four species are endangered.
Family: Dugongidae
Genus: Dugong
Dugong, D. dugon

Order: Primates 

The order Primates contains humans and their closest relatives: lemurs, lorisoids, monkeys, and apes.
Suborder: Haplorhini
Infraorder: Simiiformes
Parvorder: Catarrhini
Superfamily: Cercopithecoidea
Family: Cercopithecidae (Old World monkeys)
Genus: Papio
 Hamadryas baboon, P. hamadryas

Order: Rodentia (rodents) 
Rodents make up the largest order of mammals, with over 40% of mammalian species. They have two incisors in the upper and lower jaw which grow continually and must be kept short by gnawing.
Suborder: Hystricognathi
Family: Hystricidae (Old World porcupines)
Genus: Hystrix
 Indian crested porcupine, H. indica  
Suborder: Sciurognathi
Family: Dipodidae (jerboas)
Subfamily: Dipodinae
Genus: Jaculus
 Lesser Egyptian jerboa, J. jaculus LC
Family: Muridae (mice, rats, voles, gerbils, hamsters)
Subfamily: Deomyinae
Genus: Acomys
 Cairo spiny mouse, Acomys cahirinus LC
 Golden spiny mouse, Acomys russatus
Subfamily: Gerbillinae
Genus: Gerbillus
 Cheesman's gerbil, Gerbillus cheesmani
 Wagner's gerbil, Gerbillus dasyurus
 Black-tufted gerbil, Gerbillus famulus
 Pygmy gerbil, Gerbillus henleyi LC
 Balochistan gerbil, Gerbillus nanus LC
 Large Aden gerbil, Gerbillus poecilops
Genus: Meriones
 King jird, Meriones rex
Subfamily: Murinae
Genus: Arvicanthis
 African grass rat, A. niloticus 
Genus: Myomyscus
 Yemeni mouse, Myomys Yemeni

Order: Erinaceomorpha (hedgehogs and gymnures) 
The order Erinaceomorpha contains a single family, Erinaceidae, which comprise the hedgehogs and gymnures. The hedgehogs are easily recognised by their spines while gymnures look more like large rats.
Family: Erinaceidae (hedgehogs)
Subfamily: Erinaceinae
Genus: Paraechinus
 Desert hedgehog, P. aethiopicus

Order: Soricomorpha (shrews, moles, and solenodons) 
The "shrew-forms" are insectivorous mammals. The shrews and solenodons closely resemble mice while the moles are stout-bodied burrowers.
Family: Soricidae (shrews)
Subfamily: Crocidurinae
Genus: Crocidura
 Arabian shrew, Crocidura arabica

Order: Chiroptera (bats) 
The bats' most distinguishing feature is that their forelimbs are developed as wings, making them the only mammals capable of flight. Bat species account for about 20% of all mammals.
Family: Pteropodidae (flying foxes, Old World fruit bats)
Subfamily: Pteropodinae
Genus: Eidolon
 Straw-coloured fruit bat, Eidolon helvum LC
Genus: Rousettus
 Egyptian fruit bat, Rousettus aegyptiacus LC
Family: Vespertilionidae
Subfamily: Myotinae
Genus: Myotis
 Rufous mouse-eared bat, Myotis bocagii LC
Subfamily: Vespertilioninae
Genus: Eptesicus
 Botta's serotine, Eptesicus bottae LC
Genus: Hypsugo
 Bodenheimer's pipistrelle, Hypsugo bodenheimeri
Genus: Nycticeinops
 Schlieffen's twilight bat, Nycticeinops schlieffeni LC
Genus: Pipistrellus
 Kuhl's pipistrelle, Pipistrellus kuhlii LC
Genus: Rhyneptesicus
Sind bat, R. nasutus 
Subfamily: Miniopterinae
Genus: Miniopterus
Common bent-wing bat, M. schreibersii 
Family: Rhinopomatidae
Genus: Rhinopoma
 Egyptian mouse-tailed bat, R. cystops 
 Lesser mouse-tailed bat, Rhinopoma hardwickei LC
 Greater mouse-tailed bat, Rhinopoma microphyllum LC
Family: Molossidae
Genus: Chaerephon
 Little free-tailed bat, Chaerephon pumila LC
Genus: Otomops
 Harrison's large-eared giant mastiff bat, Otomops harrisoni VU
Genus: Tadarida
 Egyptian free-tailed bat, Tadarida aegyptiaca LC
Family: Emballonuridae
Genus: Coleura
 African sheath-tailed bat, Coleura afra LC
Family: Emballonuridae
Genus: Taphozous
Egyptian tomb bat, T. perforatus 
Family: Nycteridae
Genus: Nycteris
 Egyptian slit-faced bat, Nycteris thebaica LC
Family: Rhinolophidae
Subfamily: Rhinolophinae
Genus: Rhinolophus
Blasius's horseshoe bat, R. blasii 
 Geoffroy's horseshoe bat, Rhinolophus clivosus LC
Subfamily: Hipposiderinae
Genus: Asellia
 Trident leaf-nosed bat, Asellia tridens LC
Genus: Hipposideros
 Sundevall's roundleaf bat, Hipposideros caffer LC
Genus: Triaenops
 Persian trident bat, Triaenops persicus LC

Order: Cetacea (whales) 

The order Cetacea includes whales, dolphins and porpoises. They are the mammals most fully adapted to aquatic life with a spindle-shaped nearly hairless body, protected by a thick layer of blubber, and forelimbs and tail modified to provide propulsion underwater.
Suborder: Mysticeti
Family: Balaenopteridae
Subfamily: Balaenopterinae
Genus: Balaenoptera
 Bryde's whale, Balaenoptera edeni DD
Subfamily: Megapterinae
Genus: Megaptera
Humpback whale, M. novaeangliae 
Suborder: Odontoceti
Superfamily: Platanistoidea
Family: Physeteridae (sperm whales)
Genus: Physeter
 Sperm whale, Physeter macrocephalus VU
Family: Kogiidae
Genus: Kogia
Pygmy sperm whale, K. breviceps 
 Dwarf sperm whale, Kogia sima
Family: Ziphidae
Subfamily: Hyperoodontinae
Genus: Indopacetus
 Longman's beaked whale, I. pacificus DD
Genus: Mesoplodon
 Blainville's beaked whale, Mesoplodon densirostris DD
Family: Delphinidae (marine dolphins)
Genus: Steno
 Rough-toothed dolphin, Steno bredanensis DD
Genus: Sousa
 Chinese white dolphin, Sousa chinensis DD
Genus: Tursiops
 Common bottlenose dolphin, Tursiops truncatus DD
 Indo-Pacific bottlenose dolphin, Tursiops aduncus DD
Genus: Stenella
 Spinner dolphin, Stenella longirostris DD
 Pantropical spotted dolphin, Stenella attenuata
Genus: Delphinus
 Common dolphin, Delphinus capensis
Genus: Lagenodelphis
 Fraser's dolphin, Lagenodelphis hosei DD
Genus: Grampus
 Risso's dolphin, Grampus griseus DD
Genus: Feresa
 Pygmy killer whale, Feresa attenuata DD
Genus: Pseudorca
 False killer whale, Pseudorca crassidens

Order: Carnivora (carnivorans) 

There are over 260 species of carnivorans, the majority of which feed primarily on meat. They have a characteristic skull shape and dentition.
Suborder: Feliformia
Family: Felidae (cats)
Subfamily: Felinae
Genus: Caracal
Caracal, C. caracal 
Genus: Felis
African wildcat, F. lybica 
Sand cat, F. margarita  possibly extirpated
Subfamily: Pantherinae
Genus: Panthera
Leopard, P. pardus 
Arabian leopard, P. p. nimr 
Family: Viverridae
Subfamily: Viverrinae
Genus: Genetta
Common genet, G. genetta 
Family: Herpestidae (mongooses)
Genus: Bdeogale
Bushy-tailed mongoose, B. crassicauda  presence uncertain, introduced
Genus: Ichneumia
White-tailed mongoose, I. albicauda  
Family: Hyaenidae (hyaenas)
Genus: Hyaena
Striped hyena, H. hyaena 
Suborder: Caniformia
Family: Canidae (dogs, foxes)
Genus: Vulpes
Blanford's fox, V. cana 
Rüppell's fox, V. rueppellii 
Red fox, V. vulpes 
Genus: Canis
Golden jackal, C. aureus 
Gray wolf, C. lupus 
Arabian wolf, C. l. arabs
Family: Mustelidae (mustelids)
Genus: Mellivora
Honey badger, M. capensis

Order: Artiodactyla (even-toed ungulates) 

The even-toed ungulates are ungulates whose weight is borne about equally by the third and fourth toes, rather than mostly or entirely by the third as in perissodactyls. There are about 220 artiodactyl species, including many that are of great economic importance to humans.
Family: Bovidae (cattle, antelope, sheep, goats)
Subfamily: Antilopinae
Genus: Gazella
Arabian gazelle, G. arabica 
Queen of Sheba's gazelle, G. bilkis 
 Arabian sand gazelle, G. marica  
Subfamily: Caprinae
Genus: Capra
Nubian ibex, C. nubiana

Locally extinct 
The following species are locally extinct in the country:
Cheetah, Acinonyx jubatus
Saudi gazelle, Gazella saudiya
Arabian oryx, Oryx leucoryx

See also
List of chordate orders
Lists of mammals by region
List of prehistoric mammals
Mammal classification
List of mammals described in the 2000s

References

External links

Lists of mammals by country
Lists of mammals of the Middle East
mammals

mammals